Gecarcinucoidea is a superfamily of freshwater crabs. Its members have been grouped into families in various ways, with some authors recognizing families such as "Deckeniidae", "Sundathelphusidae", and "Parathelphusidae", but now only the family Gecarcinucidae is currently recognized.

References

 
Crabs
Taxa named by Mary J. Rathbun
Arthropod superfamilies